El Niño is the only studio album by American hip hop group Def Squad, composed of rappers Redman, Erick Sermon and Keith Murray. It was released on June 30, 1998 via Def Jam Recordings. Recording sessions took place at Mirror Image Recordings in Dix Hills, New York. Production was handled by Erick Sermon and Redman. It features guest appearances from Biz Markie, Mally G, Too $hort and the Drama Squad.

The album reached number two on the Billboard 200 and number-one spot on the Top R&B/Hip-Hop Albums in the United States. It was certified Gold by the Recording Industry Association of America on July 29, 1998. Its lead single, "Full Cooperation", peaked at #51 on the Hot R&B/Hip-Hop Songs, at #11 on the Hot Canadian Digital Song Sales, at #63 on the R&B/Hip-Hop Airplay. The song "Countdown" was released as promotional single. The song "Ride Wit Us" later appeared on Keith Murray's third album It's a Beautiful Thing.

Track listing

Personnel

Erick Sermon – vocals, producer (tracks: 2-5, 7-8, 10, 12-14, 16), executive producer
Reginald Noble – vocals, producer (tracks: 1, 6, 9, 11, 15), executive producer
Keith Omar Murray – vocals, executive producer
Jamal C. Phillips – vocals (track 3)
Todd Anthony Shaw – vocals (track 5)
Marcel Theo Hall – vocals (track 7)
Nasty Nadj – vocals (tracks: 1, 6, 9, 15)
TE TE – vocals (tracks: 1, 6, 9, 15)
Dave Rockin' Reel – vocals (tracks: 1, 6, 9, 15)
Moe Green – vocals (tracks: 1, 6, 9, 15)
Miguel – vocals (tracks: 1, 6, 9, 15)
Nikki D. – vocals (tracks: 1, 6, 9, 15)
Kevin Liles – A&R, co-executive producer
Bernard Alexander – co-executive producer
Tony Dawsey – mastering
Chris Tricarico – coordinator
Wayne Van Acker – artwork
Jonathan Mannion – photography
The Drawing Board – art direction, design

Charts

Weekly charts

Year-end charts

Certifications

See also
List of number-one R&B albums of 1998 (U.S.)

References

External links

1998 debut albums
Erick Sermon albums
Redman (rapper) albums
Keith Murray (rapper) albums
Def Jam Recordings albums
Albums produced by Erick Sermon